Young Fighters is a Malaysian football team, based in Kuala Lumpur. A reserve team for FELDA United, the team currently plays in third-tier division Malaysia FAM League.

Ownership and finances
The club were founded in 2015 and owned by FELDA United with the financial backing of its parent company, FELDA. The club was based, and played its league match in UKM Bangi Stadium in Bangi. After 2015 Malaysia FAM League season concluded, Young Fighters was pulled from the league and most of the players was released or absorbed to youth team of FELDA United which compete in Malaysia President's Cup and Malaysia Youth League.

The team were re-activated in 2018 to play in the 2018 Malaysia FAM Cup. For the 2018 season, the team played its league match at USIM Mini Stadium in Nilai, and at the UPM Mini Stadium in Serdang.

Sponsorship

Club officials

 President         :  Abdul Ghani Mohd Ali
 Manager           :  Anuar Malek
 Head coach        :  Omar Ali
 Assistant coach   :  Zolkipli Samion
 Goalkeeping coach :  Hairizal Jusof
 Fitness coach     :  Hafiz 
 Physio            :  Mohd Fikri Hakim Said
 Kitman            :  Syafik Nizu 
 Administrator Officer  :  Hafizie Mohamed
 Media Officer     :

Players

Current squad
As of 17 March 2018

References

External links
 Official website
 Soccerway Page
 Official Page

Football clubs in Malaysia
Malaysian reserve football teams